1 Wall Street (also known as the Irving Trust Company Building, the Bank of New York Building, and the BNY Mellon Building) is a skyscraper in the Financial District of Lower Manhattan, New York City, on the eastern side of Broadway between Wall Street and Exchange Place. 1 Wall Street, designed in the Art Deco style, is  tall and consists of two sections. The original 50-story building was designed by Ralph Thomas Walker of the firm Voorhees, Gmelin and Walker and constructed between 1929 and 1931, while a 36-story annex to the south was designed by successor firm Voorhees, Walker Smith Smith & Haines and built from 1963 to 1965.

The facade, made of limestone, contains slight inwardly-curved bays with fluting to resemble curtains. On the lower stories are narrow windows with mullions, as well as ornate entrances. The massing of 1 Wall Street incorporates numerous small setbacks, and the top of the original building consists of a freestanding tower. The corners of the original building consist of chamfers, while the top of the tower has fluted windowless bays. The facade of the annex is designed in a style evocative of the original structure. Inside is an ornate main lobby with colored mosaics.

1 Wall Street had been constructed for Irving Trust, one of the larger banks in New York City in the early 20th century. At the time of its construction, the building occupied what was then considered one of the most valuable plots in the city. The building replaced three previous structures, including the Manhattan Life Insurance Building, once the world's tallest building. After Irving Trust was acquired by The Bank of New York Mellon (BNY Mellon) in 1988, 1 Wall Street subsequently served as BNY Mellon's global headquarters through 2015. After the building was purchased by Harry Macklowe, it has been undergoing a renovation since 2018, which is converting the interior to residential use with some commercial space.

The building is regarded as one of New York City's Art Deco landmarks, despite initially remaining ignored in favor of such buildings as the Empire State Building and the Chrysler Building. The New York City Landmarks Preservation Commission designated the original portion of the building as a city landmark in 2001. It is also a contributing property to the Wall Street Historic District, a National Register of Historic Places district created in 2007.

Site 
1 Wall Street occupies the entire block in the Financial District of Lower Manhattan, bounded by Broadway to the west, Wall Street to the north, New Street to the east, and Exchange Place to the south. 1 Wall Street is adjacent to the Adams Express Building, 65 Broadway, the Empire Building, Trinity Church, and Trinity Church's churchyard to the west; the American Surety Company Building to the north; 14 Wall Street to the northeast; the New York Stock Exchange Building to the east; and 52 Broadway to the south.

Because of the curves in the facade, the original structure does not completely occupy its full land lot; instead,  is used as a sidewalk. Consequently, when 1 Wall Street was built, its main occupant Irving Trust embedded small metal plaques to delineate the boundaries of its lot. Under municipal law, any private land that was adjacent to public property (but not clearly marked as such) would eventually revert to the government of New York City. The presence of the plaques was meant to preclude such a seizure.

Architecture
The original building was designed by Ralph Walker of the Voorhees, Gmelin and Walker in the Art Deco style. The annex was designed by Voorhees, Gmelin and Walker's successor firm Voorhees, Walker Smith Smith & Haines. Everett Meeks, the dean of the Yale School of Art, was the building's design consultant. Dormer structures of up to two stories are located on the tops of both sections. 

Although author Daniel Abramson said 1 Wall Street was "Art Deco in many respects", historian Anthony Robins characterized the building as being "Gothic Modern—a skyscraper reflection of Trinity Church". Walker had designed other Art Deco buildings in the New York City area, mainly telecommunications structures. These included the Verizon Building (1927), New Jersey Bell Headquarters Building (1929), 60 Hudson Street (1930), and 32 Avenue of the Americas (1932), as well as telephone buildings in Upstate New York.

Form and facade 

1 Wall Street's facade is made primarily of limestone. This contrasts with the brick facades of Walker's telecommunications buildings, the use of which was likely influenced by Dutch and German Expressionism. At the time of 1 Wall Street's construction, limestone was a relatively expensive material and was rarely used for a building's entire facade, with cheaper brick being used instead. 1 Wall Street also contains numerous setbacks on its exterior. Though setbacks in New York City skyscrapers were mandated by the 1916 Zoning Resolution in order to allow light and air to reach the streets below, they later became a defining feature of the Art Deco style. The facade contains uninterrupted vertical piers, similarly to in other Art Deco buildings. Although the piers emphasize the building's height, Walker said this effect was not the main goal of his design.

Original building 
The original 1931 building is on the northern portion of the site. The first twenty stories occupy almost the entire site. The building contains a series of small setbacks starting at the 21st story and continuing until the 35th story, above which a slender tower rises. The setbacks on the Broadway and Wall Street elevations alternate with each other. The southern portion of the original building rises as high as a dormer on the 37th floor, though the 36th floor is the highest story that also connects to the annex. The tower stories, from the 37th to the 48th floors, measure  each. The top two stories constituted an executive penthouse.

Walker emphasized the design of the building's facade, rather than the massing, as was done for other early-20th-century skyscrapers in Lower Manhattan. The facade contains several decorative elements that make it appear as an organic design, rather than a machine-produced design. The facade has indented vertical bays with fluting that are arranged like curtains, although it could also resemble a cliff-like natural shape from different angles. Walker said the building would "have 200 thousand people looking at it from all sides" in a single year, including workers and pedestrians, and he wanted them to have "mental relief and pleasure" when looking at the building. Walker also said he "tried to superimpose one rhythm upon a basic rhythm"; as such, he treated the facade as a series of "rhythmic motifs" in different sizes. The resulting concave bays were angled inward at a pitch of 1:9. Each of the bays is separated by curved, projecting piers that rise to each setback. Several piers also contain vertical incisions for emphasis. The windows of the original building contained custom curved frames to fit into the facade, which added $40,000 to the construction cost.

The base of the original building is composed of the lowest three stories. The section of the base along Wall Street is eight bays wide, with a double-width entrance in the middle of the Wall Street facade, which is reached by a short flight of stairs and leads to the main lobby. The entryway is framed by a jagged portal. The sections of the base on Broadway and New Street are seventeen bays wide. On the New Street elevation, the name "Voorhees, Gmelin & Walker" is printed in cursive script. There is an exposed granite basement on New Street with a service entrance. On the upper floors, each of the bays has a single sash window on each floor. The northwestern and northeastern corners of the building both contain chamfers, which visually connect the west, north, and east elevations of the facade.

Annex 
The southern annex, completed in 1965, is also mostly made of limestone. On the New Street side, there are setbacks above the 5th and 10th floors; the building then rises as a slender slab with setbacks on the 29th, 34th, and 35th floors. Along Broadway, the facade of the annex was originally recessed behind that of the original building by two bays.

In 2018, an entrance to the retail space was constructed in front of the annex; the entrance is clad with glass. The entrance structure ranges between one and seven stories high. The facade of the 2018 addition projects forward to the facade of the original structure. Five stories were also built atop the initial portion of the annex.

Features 
The building contains 10 elevators as of 2019, compared with 43 elevators and 14 escalators prior to the residential conversion. When built, 1 Wall Street contained 29 elevators, some of which were near the building's exterior walls. Irving Trust had six private elevators, accessed from Wall Street. The rest of the building contained three groups of elevators, serving the lower, intermediate, or upper floors; these elevators could be reached from Broadway, New Street, or the subway. Because the New Street side of the building was lower than the Broadway side, engineers configured the original elevator shafts so that double-deck elevators could be installed if necessary, but these double-deck elevators were never built. At its completion, 1 Wall Street was the first office structure in Lower Manhattan to use alternating current for electric power. It contained a network of pneumatic tubes for sending documents between floors.

The original building's first through 21st stories each contained . There are also five basement levels under the original structure, three of which were below sea level. A corridor inside 1 Wall Street's basement, stretching between Broadway and New Street, provided access to the northbound platform of the Wall Street station, but it was converted to a communications room by 2000. Upon the building's opening, Irving Trust occupied the basements, lowest ten floors, and uppermost three floors of 1 Wall Street.

Lobby 

Walker and his associate Perry Coke Smith designed the room, while Hildreth Meière was hired as a "color consultant". The space functioned as a reception room rather than as a banking room, and was accessed primarily from Wall Street. As such, the Red Room had no tellers' counters. Lewis Pierson of Irving Trust described the Red Room as a place "where we shall meet our customers and friends". The eastern wall had desks for the brokers' loan officers, while the western wall contained desks for the officers of Irving Trust's city office.

Just inside the Wall Street entrance is a foyer that runs between Broadway and New Street, with two polygonal piers. The floor was made of red terrazzo tiles. Walker and Smith personally supervised the creation of the floor tiles in Berlin. The color scheme of the mosaic ranges from red-on-blue on the walls to gold-on-black on the ceiling. The mosaic gradually becomes lighter near the ceiling, thus drawing visitors' attention toward the ceiling. The mosaic also contains abstract gold patterns. The remainder of the walls are made of Pyrenees black marble, and the columns are made of Verona red marble; a similar design was used in the Stockholm City Hall. Meiere and Kimon Nicolaïdes designed the painting. When the annex was built, the expanded lobby floor was clad in travertine, and the original lobby's ceiling was covered with a dropped ceiling.

The entrances on Broadway and New Street led to a separate lobby on the ground floor, which in turn connected directly to the building's elevators. This lobby contained walls made of Pyrenees black marble.

Upper floors 
As with other early-20th-century skyscrapers in the Financial District, the lower stories had large floor areas for the building's primary tenant, Irving Trust, while the upper stories were smaller and were rented to other companies. Irving Trust occupied the first ten stories, using their large floor areas to house its clerical staff. The second floor originally contained Irving Trust's Wall Street office, which served businesses in the Financial District. The third floor was for the bank's corporate and personal trust divisions. The fifth floor contained the bank's executive offices, wainscoted with wood from around the world, while the sixth floor accommodated the out-of-town and foreign divisions and a telephone room for long-distance calls. The 10th through 45th floors were rented to outside tenants. Voorhees, Gmelin & Walker were not responsible for the layout of the offices, instead hiring specialists for that task. Architectural firms also designed some of the offices; for example, the Fiduciary Trust Company's 30th-story offices were designed by Delano and Aldrich, while the offices on the 31st story were designed by Cross & Cross.  Generally, law firms and financial firms leased entire stories for themselves. These included brokerage house Bear Stearns, which hired H. J. Horvath & Company and designer W. A. Zwicke to subdivide its 10th-floor space into various offices and other rooms.

Irving Trust's dining room was on the 46th floor. The directors' room, on the 47th floor, contained  wooden wainscoting, as well as directors' chairs arranged in a semicircle. The stories above it had dining spaces and a three-story observation lounge; these spaces contained Art Deco furnishings. The executive lounge, at the 49th story, had a ceiling made of gold-leaf seashells, as well as walls covered with multicolored patterned fabrics. The executive lounge also had a triple-height ceiling, fluted walls, teak floors, and a fireplace, as well as four full-height windows that faced each of the cardinal directions.  The walls were also decorated with depictions of Native American war bonnets.

After 1 Wall Street's residential conversion, there have been 566 condominium apartments, of which 304 are studios and one-bedroom units. Forty-seven of the condominiums have private decks. There are also amenities such as a  indoor swimming pool, 39th-floor observation deck, library, golf simulator, dog spa, and playroom. These amenities are mostly clustered in the annex.

Vault 
At the time of the building's 1931 completion, the vault was the second-largest in the city and third-largest in the world, behind those of the Federal Reserve Bank of New York Building and the Bank of England. The vault had three stories, of which the top level was used by safe-deposit customers, and the lower floors stored Irving Trust's own fortunes. Each story had  of space. The two main doors on the upper level, and one door on each of the other levels, weighed  each. A tank of water, as well as modern chemical, electrical, and mechanical features, were used to prevent potential break-ins.

History

Previous structures

Northern portion 
Since the settlement of New Amsterdam in the 17th century, only three buildings on the northern portion of the current skyscraper's site had carried the address 1 Wall Street. The first was a 17th-century stone house, and the second was built in the 19th century. The third such structure was an 18-story office building built in 1907 and designed by St. Louis-based firm Barnett, Haynes & Barnett. The structure was known as the "Chimney Building" or the "'chimney corner' building", and its footprint measured only . The Chimney Building was developed by a syndicate from St. Louis, headed by Festus Wade of the St. Louis Mercantile Trust Company. The next year, the syndicate announced that it would start erecting an 18-story structure at 1 Wall Street. The Chimney Building was completed in 1907, and for years afterward, its site was regarded as the world's most valuable.

Adjoining the Chimney Building were five other structures: a 20-story building at 74 Broadway, the 15-story Union Trust Building at 80 Broadway, and three other buildings of between 10 and 12 stories. The oldest of these was the Union Trust Building, which was erected in 1889 and had  masonry walls because engineers of the time did not know how much steel the building required. One of the twelve-story structures surrounded the Chimney Building, and in 1926, this structure and the Chimney Building were sold to a syndicate of bankers. The writer Washington Irving, the namesake of the Irving Trust Company, had occupied a house at 3 Wall Street several years before the building's development.

Southern portion 
The southern half of the block contained two structures: the Manhattan Life Insurance Building on the north and the Knickerbocker Trust Company Building to the south. The 18-story Manhattan Life Building, completed in 1894, was located in the middle of the block at 64 Broadway. The Manhattan Life Building was slightly extended north in 1904 to encompass all lots between 64 and 70 Broadway.

The Knickerbocker Trust Company bought the land immediately south of the Manhattan Life Building in early 1906, and finalized building plans the next year. The 22-story Knickerbocker Trust building at 60 Broadway was completed in 1909 and contained a ground-floor banking room, a private penthouse restaurant, and eight elevators. There was a  space between the Manhattan Life and Knickerbocker Trust buildings. A  strip of land on the northern side of the gap was sold to John E. Schermerhorn in 1912. The Schermerhorn family subsequently built an eight-story structure at 62 Broadway, within the gap.

Development 

The idea for the current skyscraper was attributed to Irving Trust president Harry Ward. Irving Trust, founded in 1851, had merged with numerous other banks in preceding years, and had outgrown its offices in 60 Broadway, the Equitable Building, and the Woolworth Building. At the time of the proposal, the bank was known as American Exchange Irving Trust, having merged in 1926 with the American Exchange-Pacific National Bank. During the mid- and late 1920s, many Art Deco office buildings were constructed in New York City, peaking around 1929 and 1930. Additionally, banks in Manhattan were clustering around Wall Street, and the corner of Broadway and Wall Street was seen as a valuable location.

Planning 
By April 1928, the Central Union Trust Company controlled the buildings from 64 to 80 Broadway, and reportedly planned to build a 36-story structure at the site of the Chimney Building. The following month, American Exchange Irving Trust bought the Chimney Building along with three adjacent structures at 7 Wall Street, and 74 and 80 Broadway, in exchange for $5.5 million in cash and a $9 million mortgage. Following the sale, the Central Union Trust Company moved to the Manhattan Life Building and modified the structures at 60, 62, and 70 Broadway.

Immediately after the purchase, Irving Trust announced it would erect an office building on the site. This announcement occurred amid an increase in the number of large banks in New York City. The company's board of directors founded a sub-committee for construction oversight, and several Irving Trust employees formed the One Wall Street Unit to coordinate logistical planning for the new skyscraper. Thirty-five potential architects were identified and interviewed extensively. Ultimately, in June 1928, Voorhees, Gmelin and Walker were hired to design the structure, and Marc Eidlitz was hired as builder. Voorhees, Gmelin and Walker filed plans with the Manhattan Bureau of Buildings the next month. The plans called for two banking rooms at ground level.

An August 1928 memorandum between the architects and Irving Trust prompted several changes to the plans. Among those were separate elevators for bank employees and rental tenants; the removal of retail spaces and luncheon clubs; and the addition of a common reception lobby. In October 1928, local newspapers reported that Irving Trust had accepted "final plans" for a 44-story building rising . This design resembled the current structure, with setbacks and a curving facade. The actual final plans, filed in June 1929, provided for a 50-story structure. The 1929 plans were released after Irving Trust applied for, and received, a zoning variance that allowed the base's first setback to be higher than would normally be allowed. The variance also allowed for a shallower setback, and the tower was allowed to cover more than 25 percent of the lot, the maximum lot coverage ratio typically allowed under the 1916 Zoning Resolution.

Construction 
Construction on the site of 1 Wall Street began in May 1929 with the demolition of the four buildings on the northern portion of the site. Several engineering professors from Columbia University were hired as consultants for the demolition process. Excavations began in July 1930, and work on the building itself began that August. The ceremonial cornerstone was laid on January 15, 1930. During the construction process, nearby structures such as Trinity Church were shored up. In March 1930, Irving Trust signed an agreement with the Interborough Rapid Transit Company, at the time one of the operators of the city's subway system, to build three new entrances to the Wall Street station on Broadway and another entrance in 1 Wall Street's basement. The project also employed timekeepers and auditors, who checked employees' attendance, as well as job runners, who delivered architectural drawings and ensured that materials were delivered.

The frame involved the installation of 250,000 rivets and was completed within five months of the groundbreaking without any serious incidents. During December 1929, Ward sent engraved letters to 500 nearby property owners, apologizing for the noise created during the riveting process; this generated positive publicity for the building in both the local and national press. When the steel frame topped out on May 12, 1930, workers hoisted an evergreen tree to the top of the frame. While the workers were securing the final rivets, a hot steel rivet fell from the building's top and hit a truck below, narrowly missing the truck driver's head and causing a small fire on the street. The exterior was completed by August 1930. Several hundred boxcars were used to transport the building's Indiana Limestone to New York City; according to railroad workers, it was the largest-ever such order. Before being used in the building, the limestone blocks went to a workshop in Long Island City, where they were carved to meet the building's specifications.

Irving Trust use 

By December 1930, Irving Trust announced that 80 percent of the space had been leased in the nearly-completed building. Tenants started moving into 1 Wall Street by mid-March 1931, before its formal opening. Among the tenants were several members of the New York Stock Exchange and Curb Exchange. The Irving Trust Company moved into the building on March 23, 1931. Two hundred guards armed with machine guns moved the bank's $8 billion holdings from its former location at the Woolworth Building. The same day, 1 Wall Street opened to public use, with thousands of visitors. By that time, the building was 90 percent occupied. Shortly afterward, the Fiduciary Trust Company of New York also moved its banking quarters to the 30th floor, making that space the highest banking quarters in New York City. In a 1938 incident, an electrical transformer on the 21st-story setback blew up; though the windows were shaken, nobody was injured. An air-conditioning system was installed at 1 Wall Street in 1953.

The original building soon became too small to accommodate the operations of Irving Trust and its tenants. Accordingly, in 1961, Irving Trust purchased from Hanover Bank the three buildings at 60, 62, and 70 Broadway, thereby giving Irving Trust control of the entire block between Broadway, Wall Street, New Street, and Exchange Place. The company initially anticipated that the annex would cost $25 million. Voorhees, Walker Smith Smith & Haines were hired to design the annex, while Turner Construction was hired as the main contractor. By mid-1963, the site had been cleared; in preparation of the work, Irving Trust took a sublease at 2 Broadway. To finance construction, Irving Trust sold the building to a subsidiary, which then sold $30 million of secured notes to investors. Renovations also took place in the original building; tenants continued to use 1 Wall Street during construction, but the vault in the basement was emptied. A refrigeration plant was installed on the annex's roof to provide air-conditioning to both buildings, and cooling machinery was also installed in the basement. The project was finished by late 1965.

By 1980, Irving Trust had decided to relocate its operations center to another building near the World Trade Center. Between 1987 and 1988, Irving Trust was negotiating to merge with the Bank of New York, which at the time was headquartered nearby at 48 Wall Street. Irving Trust initially rejected buy-out offers from the Bank of New York because the latter had "undervalued" Irving Trust's assets such as 1 Wall Street. By October 1988, with a merger imminent, Irving Trust placed 1 Wall Street for auction; at the time, the building was valued at $250 million. The Bank of New York then acquired Irving Trust in December 1988. BNY decided to sell its old headquarters at 48 Wall Street and relocate its headquarters to 1 Wall Street.

BNY Mellon opened a museum on the 10th floor in 1998, which was dedicated to the history of both banks. During the same time, BNY Mellon hired Hoffmann Architects to conduct mortar repair and window replacements. While 1 Wall Street was not damaged following the September 11 attacks at the nearby World Trade Center in 2001, BNY Mellon's operations were disrupted, and 1 Wall Street had to be cleaned up.

Sale and conversion 
By January 2014, BNY Mellon was looking to sell its headquarters, as it was moving to a location with less space. In May 2014, BNY Mellon sold the building to a joint venture led by Harry B. Macklowe's Macklowe Properties for $585 million, though BNY Mellon continued to occupy the building until September 2015. He initially planned to make 1 Wall Street a mixed-use residential and office building, and he planned to rent out 65 percent of the residences. In early 2017, Macklowe changed these plans so that it would be almost entirely residential condominiums, since an all-residential building, owned by its tenants, would require less debt. Macklowe Properties partnered with former Prime Minister of Qatar Hamad bin Jassim bin Jaber Al Thani in a bid to convert the office property into 566 condos with retail at the base. The renovation was originally supposed to be undertaken by Robert A.M. Stern Architects, though it was replaced by the firm SLCE Architects. Deutsche Bank provided $750 million in debt for the conversion.

As part of the renovation, 34 elevators and 16 escalators were removed. The original layout of the building included elevators near the perimeter wall, but this took up usable space near windows. As such, Macklowe removed 20 of the elevators that served upper floors and added 10 new elevators in the building core; new stairs were also constructed to replace the existing stairs. The demolition of the interior was completed in November 2018. In addition, the Red Room was restored between 2016 and 2018, in advance of its conversion into a retail space. The Red Room's restoration used tiles that had been placed in storage and unused when the building was originally erected. The third floor was demolished to make a higher ceiling for the retail space. A new entrance was also constructed on Broadway, with a design based on one of Walker's unrealized plans for the building, and five stories were added to the southern annex.

Whole Foods Market leased a  storefront in 2016, and Life Time Fitness signed a  lease for a gym on the lowest four floors in 2019. The residential units, the Red Room, and Whole Foods were then all planned to open in 2021. Macklowe had originally hired Core Real Estate to market the apartments. However, he replaced Core with Compass in December 2020, prompting Core to sue Macklowe for unpaid brokerage fees. The facades of the annex's additions had been completed by mid-2021, and sales of residential units were launched in September 2021. By March 2022, Macklowe and Al Thani planned to refinance 1 Wall Street for $1.1 billion, using the proceeds to pay off construction costs and outstanding debt. At that point, the renovation was projected to be completed by the end of 2022. The building's retail space was nearly complete by mid-2022, and French retailer Printemps announced it would open a store at 1 Wall Street. In addition, Macklowe Properties began exhibiting model apartments to prospective residents in 2022. , the first residents are scheduled to move into the building in March 2023.

Critical reception and landmark designation 
1 Wall Street received an accolade from the Broadway Association in 1931; the association designated the building as the "most worthy of civic endorsement" out of all structures erected around Broadway in 1930. A writer for the New York Evening Post called Meiere's lobby mural "one of the most costly and beautiful pieces of mural decoration ever attempted in the United States". Eugene Clute of Metal Arts magazine described the walls as "a rich, free-hanging fabric" and "a cage set within the frame of the building and finished with a lining that has no more structural significance than the lining of my lady's work basket". 

Architectural critics of the mid-20th century generally ignored the building in favor of more widely renowned structures, such as the Empire State Building, the Chrysler Building, and 40 Wall Street. Lewis Mumford criticized 1 Wall Street's facade for not accurately representing its internal design, saying: "Chaste though that exterior is, it is mere swank, and unconvincing swank at that". Because of Irving Trust's role as a receiver for bankrupt companies, 1 Wall Street was called the "Central Repair Shop for Broken Businesses". Architectural historian Robert A. M. Stern wrote in his 1987 book New York 1930 that 1 Wall Street's proximity to other skyscrapers including 70 Pine Street, 20 Exchange Place, 40 Wall Street, and the Downtown Athletic Club "had reduced the previous generation of skyscrapers to the status of foothills in a new mountain range". Daniel Abramson wrote in 2001 that the "corner and tower treatments appear blocky and conventional" compared to 70 Pine Street, though 1 Wall Street was still distinguished its massing and the curves in its facade.

There was also praise for what Stern characterized as "Walker's only completed skyscraper". Ada Louise Huxtable of The New York Times wrote in 1975 that 1 Wall Street was "an Art Deco masterpiece". The Times said in 2001 that a "triumvirate of great Art Deco contemporaries" in New York City would include the Empire State Building, the Chrysler Building, and 1 Wall Street. Stern stated that in 1 Wall Street's design, "structure became an unseen prop for poetry"; he further called the building's form "a natural precipice of stone shaped by erosion". Architectural writer Eric P. Nash called 1 Wall Street "one of the most delicate, even feminine, skyscrapers ever built".

In 2001, the New York City Landmarks Preservation Commission designated the original portion of 1 Wall Street as an official city landmark. The designation only included the exterior of the original building and did not extend to the southern annex. The lobby interior was not given a separate interior-landmark designation because such designations at the time were reserved for publicly accessible spaces. Since the lobby could only be used by BNY Mellon workers at the time of the exterior designation, it was legally considered to be closed to the public. As a result of the landmark designation's limited scope, most of the improvements made in the 2010s condominium conversion, such as the glass retail addition, were made to the annex. Changes to designated landmarks required the commission's approval, but the annex was out of the commission's scope. Additionally, in 2007, the building was designated as a contributing property to the Wall Street Historic District, a National Register of Historic Places district.

See also

Art Deco architecture of New York City
List of buildings and structures on Broadway in Manhattan
List of tallest buildings in New York City
List of New York City Designated Landmarks in Manhattan below 14th Street

References

Notes

Citations

Sources

External links

 

1930s architecture in the United States
Art Deco architecture in Manhattan
Art Deco skyscrapers
Bank buildings in Manhattan
Building
Broadway (Manhattan)
Financial District, Manhattan
Historic bank buildings in the United States
Historic district contributing properties in Manhattan
New York City Designated Landmarks in Manhattan
Office buildings completed in 1931
Skyscraper office buildings in Manhattan
Wall Street
1931 establishments in New York City